Mathias Widerøe-Aas (12 December 1886 – 23 February 1960) was a Norwegian footballer. He played in two matches for the Norway national football team in 1908 and 1910.

References

External links
 

1886 births
1960 deaths
Norwegian footballers
Norway international footballers
Footballers from Oslo
Association football defenders